Mikko Raita is a Helsinki, Finland based music mixing and recording engineer as well as a producer, guitar player and co-owner of Studio Kekkonen. Clients include Apocalyptica, Sunrise Avenue, Tuomo, Deep Insight, Bleak, Ana Johnsson and Stratovarius.

External links
Mikko Raita - Myspace Page

Finnish audio engineers
Living people
Musicians from Helsinki
Place of birth missing (living people)
Year of birth missing (living people)
Finnish record producers
Finnish male musicians